Thompson Usiyan (27 April 1956 – 31 August 2021) was a Nigerian professional footballer who played as a forward. He holds the NCAA Division I career scoring record and played in the North American Soccer League, Major Indoor Soccer League, American Soccer League and Continental Indoor Soccer League. He was a member of the Nigerian Olympic soccer team which boycotted the 1976 Olympics. He made several appearances for the Nigeria national team.

Youth career
In 1976, Usiyan was selected as a member of the Nigerian 1976 Olympic team. Although the team travelled to the Olympics, which were held in Montreal, Quebec, Canada, it did not compete as a result of a boycott of the games by African and Arab nations. Usiyan chose to remain in North America and received scholarship offers to attend Clemson University, Howard University and Appalachian State University. He chose Appalachian where he set an NCAA record of 109 career goals. Usiyan also set records for most career points (255), goals in a season (46 in 1980), and points in a season (108 in 1980). He was the Southern Conference Player of the Year in 1977, '78, and '80.

Club career
In 1981, Usiyan signed with the Montreal Manic of the North American Soccer League. The Manic traded Usiyan to the Tulsa Roughnecks following the 1982 season. Leg injuries limited him to eleven games for the Roughnecks in 1983. The team released him on 11 March 1984. On 12 April 1984, he signed with the Oklahoma City Stampede of the United Soccer League. He led the league in scoring and finished third in the points standings. In the fall of 1984, he signed with the Minnesota Strikers of the Major Indoor Soccer League. In 1985, he briefly returned to the outdoor game when he signed with the Tulsa Tornados of the USL, but the league collapsed after only six games. Usiyan had arthroscopic surgery later in the summer, but returned to the Strikers in the fall of 1985 and spent the next two seasons in Minnesota. On 26 March 1987, the Strikers traded Usiyan to the Los Angeles Lazers in exchange for Greg Ion after Usiyan had a locker room fight with Strikers goalkeeper Tino Lettieri. Usiyan remained with the Lazers through the 1987–88 season. He did not play again until signed by the Maryland Bays of the American Soccer League in June 1989. During his time away from soccer, he finished his business degree at Appalachian State. On 9 August 1989, he returned to MISL when he signed with the St. Louis Storm. During his two seasons in St. Louis, Usiyan began working as a tax consultant. After finishing his degree, he had spent some time as an accountant and after his retirement, he became a full-time tax consultant.  During the summer of 1991, Usiyan played for the Hamilton Steelers in the Canadian Soccer League. On 9 September 1991, the Storm traded Usiyan to the San Diego Sockers in exchange for Branko Segota and the Sockers 1992 first round draft choice. Usiyan won the 1992 MISL championship with the Sockers. On 20 November 1992, Usiyan signed with the St. Louis Ambush of the National Professional Soccer League. On 1 June 1993, the Arizona Sandsharks drafted Usiyan in the first round of the 1993 Continental Indoor Soccer League supplemental draft. Two days later, the San Diego Sockers traded Wes Wade to the Sandsharks in exchange for Usiyan, Alex Golovnia and Nassim Olabi. On 10 September 1993, the league suspended Usiyan indefinitely for accumulated red cards. On 21 June 1995, the San Jose Grizzlies of the CISL drafted Usiyan after he was cleared by the league to play. He retired permanently at the end of the season.

Usiyan was the MISL's sixteenth leading scorer in 1984–85 as a member of the Minnesota Strikers, with 62 points in 47 games. He was fifteenth best a season later with 60 points in 40 contests. Usiyan finished eighth in scoring in the 1987–88 season as a member of the Los Angeles Lazers with 88 points in 51 games. He was sixth best in 1990–91 with 102 points in 51 games played for the St. Louis Storm. Usiyan was amongst the leaders one final time (in the league's last season) finishing fifteenth with 57 points in 40 games playing with the San Diego Sockers. He was named Championship Series Most Valuable Player as the Sockers won the championship.

International career
Usiyan made several appearances for Nigeria, including a 2–0 1982 FIFA World Cup qualifying loss to Algeria on 10 October 1981 in Lagos. He scored on his debut, a friendly match against Kenya in 1976. Usiyan also played for Nigeria at the 1976 African Cup of Nations finals in Ethiopia. He won a silver medal with the Nigerian squad at the 1978 All-Africa Games in Algiers.

Usiyan made his home in San Diego where he was a tax consultant.

References

External links
Watauga Democrat Sports article on Usyian
MISL: A Look Back
NASL/MISL stats

1956 births
2021 deaths
American Soccer League (1988–89) players
Appalachian State Mountaineers men's soccer players
Maryland Bays players
Canadian Soccer League (1987–1992) players
Continental Indoor Soccer League players
Expatriate soccer players in Canada
Expatriate soccer players in the United States
Association football forwards
Hamilton Steelers (1981–1992) players
Los Angeles Lazers players
Major Indoor Soccer League (1978–1992) players
Minnesota Strikers (MISL) players
Montreal Manic players
National Professional Soccer League (1984–2001) players
Nigeria international footballers
1976 African Cup of Nations players
Nigerian expatriate footballers
Nigerian expatriate sportspeople in Canada
Nigerian expatriate sportspeople in the United States
Nigerian footballers
North American Soccer League (1968–1984) players
North American Soccer League (1968–1984) indoor players
Oklahoma City Stampede players
Soccer players from San Diego
San Diego Sockers (CISL) players
San Diego Sockers (original MISL) players
San Jose Grizzlies players
St. Louis Ambush (1992–2000) players
St. Louis Storm players
Tulsa Roughnecks (1978–1984) players
Tulsa Tornados players
United Soccer League (1984–85) players
Sportspeople from Delta State
African Games silver medalists for Nigeria
African Games medalists in football
Competitors at the 1978 All-Africa Games